The 778th Expeditionary Airlift Squadron is a provisional United States Air Force squadron activated after 3 May 2002, being engaged in the Global War on Terrorism.  Its current status is undetermined.

The squadron was first active during World War II as the 778th Bombardment Squadron.  The squadron flew Consolidated B-24 Liberators in the Mediterranean Theater of Operations, earning two Distinguished Unit Citations for its actions.   Following the war, the squadron helped transport troops back to the United States.

The squadron was reactivated in 1953 as the 778th Troop Carrier Squadron, when it replaced the 73d Troop Carrier Squadron, a reserve unit that had been called to active duty for the Korean War at Lawson Air Force Base, Georgia.  It moved to Pope Air Force Base, North Carolina, where it successively flew Fairchild C-119 Flying Boxcars and Fairchild C-123 Providers.  It converted to Lockheed C-130 Hercules aircraft.  It frequently deployed to other theaters, and participated in Operation Dragon Rouge and Operation Power Pack.  It was inactivated on 31 August 1971, when the 40th Tactical Airlift Squadron replaced it at Pope.

History

World War II

The 778th Bombardment Squadron was activated on 1 August 1943 at Wendover Field, Utah as a Consolidated B-24 Liberator heavy bombardment unit.  The squadron was one of the 464th Group's four original squadrons, After gathering its initial cadre, the squadron moved to Gowen Field, Idaho for training with II Bomber Command. After training in Idaho and Utah, the squadron began its move to the Mediterranean Theater of Operations in February 1944.

The 778th deployed to southern Italy in February 1944, where it became part of Fifteenth Air Force's 55th Bombardment Wing. The air echelon trained for a few weeks in Tunisia before joining the remainder of the group in Italy and entering combat in April.

The group engaged in long range strategic bombing missions to enemy military, industrial and transportation targets in Italy, France, Germany, Austria, Hungary, Romania, and Yugoslavia, bombing railroad marshaling yards, oil refineries, airdrome installations, heavy industry, and other strategic objectives.

Notable missions of the Oil Campaign of World War II included Operation Tidal Wave, bombing of the Concordia Vega Refinery near Ploiești on 18 May 1944, the marshaling yards and oil refinery at Vienna on 8 July 1944, for which the squadron was awarded the Distinguished Unit Citation, and the Pardubice oil refinery and nearby railroad tracks on 24 August 1944, for which it also was awarded a Distinguished Unit Citation.

The squadron sometimes engaged in support and interdiction operations. It supported Allied forces during Operation Dragoon, the invasion of Southern France in August 1944. It hit railroad centers to assist the advance of the Red Army in southeastern Europe in March 1945. It bombed enemy supply lines to assist the advance of the US Fifth and British Eighth Army in northern Italy in April 1945.

After V-E Day, the squadron was assigned to the Green Project, the movement of troops from Europe to the United States via the South Atlantic Transport Route. B-24s were modified with sealed bomb bays, removal of all defensive armament and internal fuselage equipped with seating to carry approximately 30 personnel. It was assigned to Air Transport Command (ATC) at Waller Field, Trinidad. The group moved personnel from Natal, Brazil and Atkinson Field, British Guiana to Morrison Field, Florida. It provided air transport until the end of July when the unit was inactivated, and its personnel transferred to elements of the South Atlantic and Caribbean Wings of ATC.

Replacement of reserve wing

The squadron was reactivated as the 778th Troop Carrier Squadron and activated at Lawson Air Force Base, Georgia on 1 February 1953. The squadron replaced the 73d Troop Carrier Squadron, a reserve unit that had been called to active duty for the Korean War with its parent 434th Troop Carrier Wing.  The 434th Wing was in the process of transitioning from the Curtiss C-46 Commando to the Fairchild C-119 Flying Boxcar when the squadron took over the personnel and aircraft of the 73d.  In September 1954, the squadron moved to Pope Air Force Base, North Carolina where it was colocated with the Army's 82d Airborne Division at Fort Bragg.

The unit provided tactical airlift of troops and cargo, participated in joint airborne training with Army forces, and took part in tactical exercises in the United States and overseas. The squadron provided aeromedical airlift and flew humanitarian missions as required.

Assault operations and early Vietnam support

In November 1957, the 464th Troop Carrier Wing converted to the dual deputy organization.  The wing's 464th Troop Carrier Group was inactivated, and the squadron was assigned directly to the wing. The squadron, meanwhile, began trading its C-119s for Fairchild C-123 Providers before the end of the year.  The squadron continued airlift support missions with its providers until January 1964, when it began converting to the Lockheed C-130 Hercules

C-130 Hercules operations
In 1964, the Simba rebellion began in the Congo and rebels gained control of large areas of the eastern part of the country, including Stanleyville and the United States consulate there, taking several State Department employees and others captive. The United States set up a Joint Task Force, which included four C-130s of the 464th Wing to rescue State Department employees in Stanleyville.  The Wing's commitment increased to 14 aircraft with the development of an expanded rescue plan called Operation Dragon Rouge.  These aircraft and crews were on rotation duty with the 322d Air Division at Evreux Air Base, France and were conveniently located to airlift Belgian forces. The wing dropped Belgian paratroops into Stanleyville, and after the runways were cleared, landed additional troops at Simi-Simi Airport.  Once the city was secured, The C-130s began shuttling refugees out of the city, under fire as they departed, and with 100 passengers on each plane.  Five aircraft were damaged as 2,000 refugees were evacuated. An additional 500–1000 were evacuated from Paulis in a follow-on operation, although not all hostages could be rescued and a number were executed by the Simba rebels. The 464th Wing received the Mackay Trophy for this operation.

In April 1965, the United States decided to deploy troops to the Dominican Republic following the start of a civil war there.  on 30 April, aircraft of the 464th Wing airlanded the 3rd Brigade of the 82d Airborne Division at San Isidro Air Base. The 46 aircraft dispatched to San Isidro so overcrowded the field that many were unable to unload and some had to be diverted to Ramey Air Force Base, Puerto Rico. The following day, "an air bridge was established between Pope and San Isidro . . . with a transport . . . landing on an average . . .  once every five minutes." In late May, the operation in the Dominican Republic came under the aegis of the Organization of American States and American planes flew in the first Latin American troops.

The squadron continued to performed tactical airlift missions until August 1971 when it was inactivated and its mission, personnel and equipment were absorbed by the 40th Tactical Airlift Squadron, which moved on paper from Lockbourne Air Force Base, Ohio.

Expeditionary operations
The squadron was redesignated the 778th Expeditionary Airlift Squadron, converted to provisional status, and assigned to Air Combat Command to activate or inactivate as needed. It was activated as a Lockheed C-130 Hercules airlift squadron as part of the Global War on Terrorism. By January 2003, the squadron was flying missions in Afghanistan with crews deployed from Little Rock Air Force Base.

Lineage
 Constituted as the 778th Bombardment Squadron (Heavy) on 19 May 1943
 Activated on 1 August 1943
 Inactivated on 31 July 1945
 Redesignated: 778th Bombardment Squadron, Very Heavy on 14 November 1945
 Redesignated: 778th Troop Carrier Squadron, Medium on 15 December 1952
 Activated on 1 February 1953
 Redesignated: 778th Troop Carrier Squadron, Assault on 1 December 1958
 Redesignated: 778th Troop Carrier Squadron, Medium on 8 January 1964
 Redesignated: 778th Troop Carrier Squadron on 1 March 1966
 Redesignated: 778th Tactical Airlift Squadron on 1 May 1967
 Inactivated on 31 August 1971.
 Converted to provisional status and redesignated as 778th Expeditionary Airlift Squadron on 3 May 2002
 Activated by January 2003

Assignments
 464th Bombardment Group, 1 August 1943 – 31 July 1945 (attached to Air Transport Command after 15 June 1945)
 464th Troop Carrier Group, 1 February 1953
 464th Troop Carrier Wing (later 464th Tactical Airlift Wing), 11 November 1957 – 31 August 1971
 Air Combat Command to activate or inactivate as needed, 3 May 2002
 320th Expeditionary Operations Group, January 2003

Stations

 Wendover Field, Utah, 1 August 1943
 Gowen Field, Idaho, 22 August 1943
 Pocatello Army Air Field, Idaho, 2 October 1943 – 9 February 1944
 Pantanella Airfield, Italy, 10 April 1944
 Gioia del Colle Airfield, Italy, 20 April 1944
 Pantanella Airfield, Italy, c. 1 June 1944-c. 6 June 1945
 Waller Field, Trinidad, 15 June-31 July 1945
 Lawson Air Force Base, Georgia, 1 February 1953
 Pope Air Force Base, North Carolina, 16 September 1954 – 31 August 1971
 Unknown, January 2003

Aircraft

 Consolidated B-24 Liberator, 1943–1945
 Curtiss C-46 Commando, 1953–1954
 Fairchild C-119 Flying Boxcar, 1953–1958
 Fairchild C-123 Provider, 1958–1968
 Lockheed C-130 Hercules, 1968–1971; undetermined

Awards and Campaigns

References

Notes
 Explanatory notes

 Citations

Bibliography

 
 
 
 
 
 
 
 
 
 
 
 

Airlift squadrons of the United States Air Force